The IV Corps of the Grande Armée was a French military unit that existed during the Napoleonic Wars. It consisted of several different units and commanders.

War of the Third Coalition
The corps was formed in 1805, with Marshal Jean-de-Dieu Soult being appointed as its commander.

The IV Corps formed part of the extended center of the French line at the Battle of Austerlitz in December 1805. During the battle, Napoleon ordered Soult to attack the Pratzen Heights, from which the Allies had been attacking the French right wing. Repeated attacks from the Russians under General Kutuzov almost broke through the line of IV Corps, but aid from Marshal Jean-Baptiste Bernadotte's I Corps allowed the French to maintain their control of the Heights. The survivors then moved south and enveloped General Friedrich Wilhelm von Buxhoeveden's column, sending the Allies into a retreat.

War of the Fourth Coalition
The corps formed the right wing of the French line at the Battle of Jena in October 1806. At Eylau in February 1807, the corps was beaten back by the Russian Army under Generals Tutchkov and Dmitry Dokhturov.

In 1808, Soult was transferred to Spain, where he took command of the II Corps in the Peninsular War.

Russian campaign
The corps consisted mainly of troops from the Kingdom of Italy by the time of the invasion of Russia in 1812. It was commanded by Napoleon's stepson Eugène de Beauharnais. The corps participated in the Battle of Borodino, where it formed the left wing of the French line. Later, it also fought at the battles of Malojaroslavec and Viazma. The corps suffered heavy casualties during the retreat.

Commanders at Borodino
Corps commander: Prince Eugène de Beauharnais; 
Divisional commanders:
General de division Delzons
General de division Broussier
General de brigade Lechi
 Corps cavalry under General de division d'Ornano
 Corps artillery under General de division d'Anthouard de Vraincourt

War of the Sixth Coalition
Under the command of General Henri Gatien Bertrand, it took part in the battles of Lützen, Großbeeren, Dennewitz, Wartenburg and Leipzig.

War of the Seventh Coalition
The corps was headed by General Étienne Maurice Gérard in 1815 and took part in the Battle of Ligny and the Battle of Waterloo.

Notes

References

 Chandler, David G. (1979). Dictionary of the Napoleonic Wars. New York: Macmillan Publishing Co., Inc. 

1805 establishments in France
GAI04